José Giorgetti (15 April 1934 – 18 March 2004) was an Argentine boxer. He competed in the men's heavyweight event at the 1956 Summer Olympics. At the 1956 Summer Olympics, he lost to Daniel Bekker of South Africa.

References

1934 births
2004 deaths
Argentine male boxers
Olympic boxers of Argentina
Boxers at the 1956 Summer Olympics
Boxers from Buenos Aires
Heavyweight boxers